John Hennessy (August 20, 1825 – March 4, 1900) was a 19th-century Irish-born prelate of the Roman Catholic Church who served as bishop and archbishop in the United States. He served as bishop and then the first archbishop of the Archdiocese of Dubuque, Iowa from 1866–1900.

Biography

Early life and education
John Hennessy was born August 20, 1825 in Bulgaden, County Limerick, Ireland.  He was the oldest of twelve children born to William and Mary (Meaney) Hennessy.  He studied for the priesthood initially at All Hallows College, Dublin then at St. Vincent's Seminary in Cape Girardeau, Missouri and Carondelet Seminary near St. Louis.

Ordination and ministry
He was ordained a priest for the Archdiocese of Saint Louis on November 1, 1850. Father Hennessy was assigned to parish work in New Madrid, Missouri and then St. Peter's in Gravois.  He then served as a seminary professor and then president at Carondelet, and in 1858 he was sent to the Holy See as a representative of Archbishop Kenrick. From 1860 to 1866 he was a pastor of St. Joseph's Church in St. Joseph, Missouri.

Bishop and Archbishop of Dubuque, Iowa
On April 24, 1866 Pope Pius IX appointed Hennessy as the third bishop of Dubuque. He was consecrated and installed bishop in St. Raphael's Cathedral on September 30, 1866 by Archbishop Peter Richard Kenrick of Saint Louis.  The principal co-consecrators were Bishops John Martin Henni of Milwaukee and James Duggan of Chicago.

Bishop Hennessy attended the First Vatican Council in Rome from 1869–70.  He also took a prominent role in the Third Plenary Council of Baltimore in 1884.

In 1878, at his suggestion, the Sisters of the Third Order of St. Francis of the Holy Family relocated from Iowa City to Dubuque to staff a German Catholic Orphan Asylum.

When Hennessy became bishop, the territory of the diocese encompassed the entire state of Iowa. He became convinced, as had Bishop Smyth before him, that the diocese should be divided in two. Archbishop Kenrick and the other bishops of the province advocated splitting Iowa into two with a diocese in the east (Dubuque) and one in the west (Council Bluffs).  Others, including the Revs. J.A.M. Pelamourgues and Andrew Trevis, envisioned a new See with Davenport as its headquarters.  On May 8, 1881 Pope Leo XIII established the new Diocese of Davenport.  Davenport was chosen because of the income the new bishop would receive from the commercial properties owned by the church on Church Square (St. Anthony's Church) in Davenport.  The Dubuque Diocese now covered roughly the northern half of Iowa.

An advocate of Catholic education, Hennessy had schools and convents established in all of the large cities in Iowa.  He founded St. Joseph's College (now Loras College) in Dubuque on September 8, 1873.  Some Catholics in the diocese opposed the expansion of Catholic schools for economic reasons, and because they felt it was an attack on public school education.

During his tenure as bishop and archbishop, Hennessy oversaw the expansion of the diocese even though this was a period of anti-Catholic sentiments in Dubuque and across the United States.  When he arrived in Dubuque, there were 27 priests, 30 churches, two schools and seven sisters. By 1891 there were 203 priests, 319 churches, 615 sisters, and over 135 parochial schools with 16,257 students.  This was after the diocese had lost almost half of its territory ten years before.

On June 15, 1893, Pope Leo XIII elevated the Diocese of Dubuque to the status of an archdiocese, and Bishop Hennessy became the first Archbishop of Dubuque. The Ecclesial Province of Dubuque included the dioceses of Davenport, Omaha, Wichita and Sioux Falls.

Archbishop Hennessy died in Dubuque on March 4, 1900.  He was a man of some means for his time as he left an estate of $700,000. It was divided among several Catholic charities.

In the last years of his life, Hennessy requested that a mortuary chapel be built in St. Raphael's Cathedral. This new chapel was built in the basement of the cathedral and completed two years after his death.  The remains of Bishops Mathias Loras, Clement Smyth, and Hennessy were brought to the cathedral and buried in this new chapel.

Legacy
Archbishop Hennessy is one of the more prominent figures in the history of the archdiocese, as the latter half of the 19th century was a period of growth for the archdiocese, and as he also served as the leader of the archdiocese for over 30 years. Loras College honored Hennessy by naming one of its buildings after him.

A stained glass window in St. Joseph Church in Sioux City, Iowa contains a portrait of Archbishop Hennessy. His episcopal coat of arms is in the stained glass window above the east side entrance to St. Mary's Church in Iowa City, Iowa, which he dedicated in 1869.

See also

 Catholic Church in the United States
 Historical list of the Catholic bishops of the United States
 List of the Catholic bishops of the United States
 Lists of patriarchs, archbishops, and bishops

References

External links
Bishops Archbishops of Dubuque
 
 Roman Catholic Archdiocese of Dubuque

1825 births
1900 deaths
Irish emigrants to the United States (before 1923)
Clergy from County Limerick
19th-century Roman Catholic archbishops in the United States
American Roman Catholic clergy of Irish descent
Roman Catholic Archdiocese of St. Louis
Roman Catholic bishops of Dubuque
Roman Catholic archbishops of Dubuque
Religious leaders from Missouri